Danno may refer to:

Stefan Dannö (born 1969), Swedish Speedway racer
Danno O'Mahony (1912-1950), Irish professional wrestler
Dan O'Keeffe (1907-1967), Irish Gaelic football goalkeeper nicknamed "Danno"
Danny "Danno" Williams, a fictional character from the Hawaii Five-O television series, whence the catchphrase "Book 'em, Danno!"

See also
Denno (disambiguation)
Dano (disambiguation)